Roorbach is a surname. Notable people with the surname include:

Bill Roorbach (born 1953), American novelist, short story writer, memoirist, journalist, blogger and critic
Eloise Roorbach (1868–1961), American artist, writer, editor and critic
Orville Augustus Roorbach (1803–1861), American publisher and bibliographer